The 2004–05 Columbus Blue Jackets season was the Blue Jackets' fifth season in the National Hockey League (NHL). The 2004–05 NHL lockout, however, cancelled the entirety of the season.

Syracuse Crunch
A number of players from the Blue Jackets played the year with the team's American Hockey League (AHL) affiliate, the Syracuse Crunch. The Crunch finished the season in fifth place in the seven-team North Division with a 36–33–4–7 record, earning 83 points. However, they failed to qualify for the 2005 Calder Cup playoffs

Europe
While some Blue Jackets joined the Crunch during the lockout, others crossed the Atlantic and played hockey in Europe. Reigning joint-Maurice "Rocket" Richard Trophy winner Rick Nash played for HC Davos in the National League A (NLA) in Switzerland, while David Vyborny returned to his native Czech Republic to play with Sparta Prague. Meanwhile, Nikolai Zherdev returned to Russia to play for former club CSKA Moscow.

Schedule
The Blue Jackets preseason and regular season schedules were announced on July 13 and July 14, 2004, respectively.

|-
| 1 || September 24 || Buffalo Sabres
|-
| 2 || September 26 || @ Chicago Blackhawks
|-
| 3 || September 29 || Chicago Blackhawks
|-
| 4 || October 1 || Nashville Predators
|-
| 5 || October 2 || @ Nashville Predators
|-
| 6 || October 6 || New York Rangers
|-
| 7 || October 8 || Pittsburgh Penguins
|-
| 8 || October 9 || @ Pittsburgh Penguins
|-

|-
| 1 || October 15 || Buffalo Sabres
|-
| 2 || October 16 || @ Chicago Blackhawks
|-
| 3 || October 19 || San Jose Sharks
|-
| 4 || October 21 || Colorado Avalanche
|-
| 5 || October 23 || @ Calgary Flames
|-
| 6 || October 24 || @ Vancouver Canucks
|-
| 7 || October 26 || @ Edmonton Oilers
|-
| 8 || October 28 || @ Phoenix Coyotes
|-
| 9 || October 30 || @ Dallas Stars
|-
| 10 || November 1 || @ St. Louis Blues
|-
| 11 || November 5 || Detroit Red Wings
|-
| 12 || November 7 || Dallas Stars
|-
| 13 || November 9 || Edmonton Oilers
|-
| 14 || November 12 || Los Angeles Kings
|-
| 15 || November 13 || @ Detroit Red Wings
|-
| 16 || November 18 || Phoenix Coyotes
|-
| 17 || November 20 || @ Dallas Stars
|-
| 18 || November 22 || @ Colorado Avalanche
|-
| 19 || November 24 || Dallas Stars
|-
| 20 || November 26 || St. Louis Blues
|-
| 21 || December 1 || @ Detroit Red Wings
|-
| 22 || December 3 || @ Calgary Flames
|-
| 23 || December 5 || @ Edmonton Oilers
|-
| 24 || December 6 || @ Vancouver Canucks
|-
| 25 || December 9 || Toronto Maple Leafs
|-
| 26 || December 11 || @ St. Louis Blues
|-
| 27 || December 12 || Vancouver Canucks
|-
| 28 || December 15 || Minnesota Wild
|-
| 29 || December 17 || Phoenix Coyotes
|-
| 30 || December 19 || Tampa Bay Lightning
|-
| 31 || December 23 || Chicago Blackhawks
|-
| 32 || December 26 || Pittsburgh Penguins
|-
| 33 || December 28 || Anaheim Mighty Ducks
|-
| 34 || December 29 || @ Atlanta Thrashers
|-
| 35 || December 31 || St. Louis Blues
|-
| 36 || January 2 || @ Minnesota Wild
|-
| 37 || January 6 || @ New York Rangers
|-
| 38 || January 7 || @ Carolina Hurricanes
|-
| 39 || January 9 || Calgary Flames
|-
| 40 || January 12 || Chicago Blackhawks
|-
| 41 || January 14 || Colorado Avalanche
|-
| 42 || January 15 || @ Nashville Predators
|-
| 43 || January 17 || @ Anaheim Mighty Ducks
|-
| 44 || January 20 || @ San Jose Sharks
|-
| 45 || January 22 || @ Los Angeles Kings
|-
| 46 || January 24 || Minnesota Wild
|-
| 47 || January 26 || Montreal Canadiens
|-
| 48 || January 28 || @ Chicago Blackhawks
|-
| 49 || January 30 || Anaheim Mighty Ducks
|-
| 50 || February 1 || @ St. Louis Blues
|-
| 51 || February 2 || @ Pittsburgh Penguins
|-
| 52 || February 5 || @ New York Islanders
|-
| 53 || February 8 || San Jose Sharks
|-
| 54 || February 10 || Nashville Predators
|-
| 55 || February 15 || Edmonton Oilers
|-
| 56 || February 17 || New York Rangers
|-
| 57 || February 20 || @ Chicago Blackhawks
|-
| 58 || February 23 || Nashville Predators
|-
| 59 || February 25 || Chicago Blackhawks
|-
| 60 || February 26 || Florida Panthers
|-
| 61 || February 28 || @ New Jersey Devils
|-
| 62 || March 4 || Nashville Predators
|-
| 63 || March 5 || St. Louis Blues
|-
| 64 || March 7 || @ Boston Bruins
|-
| 65 || March 9 || Los Angeles Kings
|-
| 66 || March 11 || Detroit Red Wings
|-
| 67 || March 12 || @ Minnesota Wild
|-
| 68 || March 14 || @ Nashville Predators
|-
| 69 || March 16 || @ Washington Capitals
|-
| 70 || March 18 || Vancouver Canucks
|-
| 71 || March 21 || @ Philadelphia Flyers
|-
| 72 || March 23 || Boston Bruins
|-
| 73 || March 25 || @ Colorado Avalanche
|-
| 74 || March 26 || @ San Jose Sharks
|-
| 75 || March 28 || @ Phoenix Coyotes
|-
| 76 || March 30 || Calgary Flames
|-
| 77 || April 1 || @ Detroit Red Wings
|-
| 78 || April 2 || Ottawa Senators
|-
| 79 || April 5 || @ Nashville Predators
|-
| 80 || April 6 || Detroit Red Wings
|-
| 81 || April 9 || @ Los Angeles Kings
|-
| 82 || April 10 || @ Anaheim Mighty Ducks
|-

Transactions
The Blue Jackets were involved in the following transactions from June 8, 2004, the day after the deciding game of the 2004 Stanley Cup Finals, through February 16, 2005, the day the  season was officially cancelled.

Trades

Players acquired

Players lost

Signings

Draft picks
Columbus' draft picks at the 2004 NHL Entry Draft.

Notes

References

External links
SHRP Sports
The Internet Hockey Database
National Hockey League Guide & Record Book 2007

Columbus
Columbus Blue Jackets seasons
Colum
Columbus Blue Jackets
Columbus Blue Jackets